Otto is a given name of Germanic origin.

Otto or otto may also refer to:

Companies
Otto (company), autonomous trucking company
OTTO Motors, self-driving factory robots
Otto., Finland's interbank network
Otto GmbH, a German mail order company
Otto Flugmaschinenfabrik, a 1910s German aircraft manufacturing company

People
 Otto I, Holy Roman Emperor reigned 962-973
 Otto II, Holy Roman Emperor reigned 973-983
 Otto III, Holy Roman Emperor reigned 996-1002
 Otto, Count of Cleves (1278–1310)
 Otto, Count of Lippe-Brake (1589–1657)
 Otto, Duke of Lolland and Estonia (1310–1346)
 Otto, Count of Looz (fl. 980-1000)
 Otto, Count of Vermandois (979–1045)
 Otto, Landgrave of Hesse-Kassel (1594–1617)
 Otto, Lord of Arkel (1330–1396)
 Otto, Lord of Lippe (1300–1360)
 Otto, Margrave of the Nordmark (died 1057)
 Otto (singer), Brazilian singer
 Otto (surname)

Places
 Otto, Indiana, USA
 Otto, New York, USA
 Otto, North Carolina, USA
 Otto, West Virginia, USA
 Otto, Wyoming, USA
 Otto Township (disambiguation)

Other
 , a German coaster
 Operation Otto (1943), Axis powers anti-partisan operation in Croatia in 1943
 Operation Otto (1938), an Axis operational codename for the annexation of Austria
 Otto Celera 500L, an experimental Americal business and utility aircraft built by Otto Aviation
 Otto (dog breed), a breed also known as the Alapaha Blue Blood Bulldog
 Otto (Greyhawk), a wizard in the World of Greyhawk campaign setting for the Dungeons & Dragons roleplaying game
 Otto cycle, the thermodynamic cycle of a typical reciprocating piston engine
 Otto – Der Film, a 1985 German movie
 Otto engine, an early internal combustion engine invented by Nicolaus Otto
 Otto; or Up with Dead People, a 2008 zombie movie
 Otto the Orange, the mascot of Syracuse University
 2962 Otto, a main-belt asteroid
 8 (number), Otto in Italian
 Otto, or attar, or ittar any essential oil produced by distillation
 Otto, a character in the Disney Junior cartoon SuperKitties

See also 
 Auto (disambiguation)
 Hurricane Otto (disambiguation)
 Otho (disambiguation)
 Oto (disambiguation)
 Otto's (disambiguation)